Silent Tongues is a live album by Cecil Taylor on solo piano recorded at the Montreux Jazz Festival in 1974. It features Taylor's five-movement work "Silent Tongues", along with two encores.

Reception

Reviewing in Christgau's Record Guide: Rock Albums of the Seventies (1981), Robert Christgau wrote: "Since I recommend Taylor's appearances so extravagantly, it's only fair to note that there is a natural theater to his live performance that I miss on record—observing his concentration greatly increases my own. Especially solo, he's too abstract for a rock and roller to follow."

The AllMusic review by Scott Yanow stated: "To simplify in explaining what he was doing at this point of time, it can be said that Taylor essentially plays the piano like a drum set, creating percussive and thunderous sounds that are otherworldly and full of an impressive amount of energy and atonal ideas. Many listeners will find these performances to be quite difficult but it is worth the struggle to open up one's perceptions as to what music can be."

Silent Tongues was DownBeats album of the year for 1975.

Track listing 
All compositions by Cecil Taylor
 "Abyss (First Movement)"/"Petals and Filaments (Second Movement)"/"Jitney (Third Movement)" - 18:23  
 "Crossing Part 1 (Fourth Movement Part 1)" - 8:36  
 "Crossing Part 2 (Fourth Movement Part 2)" - 10:00  
 "After All (Fifth Movement)" - 9:59  
 "Jitney No. 2" - 4:11  
 "After All No. 2" - 2:50 
Recorded at Montreux on July 2, 1974

Personnel 
 Cecil Taylor – piano

References 

1975 live albums
Cecil Taylor live albums
Freedom Records live albums
Live instrumental albums
Solo piano jazz albums